Parliamentary elections were held in the Federated States of Micronesia on 20 March 1995. All candidates for seats in Congress ran as independents.

Results

References

Micronesia
1995 in the Federated States of Micronesia
Elections in the Federated States of Micronesia
Non-partisan elections